Henrik Skadelår (c. 1090 - 4 June 1134) was a Danish prince, the son of Svend Tronkræver, an illegitimate son of king Sweyn II of Denmark. He was the father of King Magnus II of Sweden.  He died in the Battle of Fotevik.

After the murder on his cousin Knud Lavard in 1131, Henrik Skadelår was mentioned as a possible future king of Denmark. However, his uncle Niels survived Henrik by three weeks.

Marriage
Henrik was married to Ingrid Ragnvaldsdotter, daughter of Ragnvald Knaphövde. The marriage was miserable, and Ingrid once tried to escape her husband in men's clothing, but was found and brought back to Henrik. When Henrik died Ingrid left Denmark and married Harald Gille, the future king of Norway. Ingrid later became Queen Ingrid of Norway. After Harald Gille she had several marriages with the powerful gentry in Norway and became mother to the next generation of bishops and pretenders to the Norwegian throne.

Issues
Henrik Skadelår had at least five sons: 
 Magnus Henriksson, died 1161. King of Sweden 1160–1161. Magnus was married to his half-sister Birgitta, (daughter of Harald Gille and Ingrid Ragnvaldsdatter).
 Ragvald Henriksson, died 1161. 
 Knud Henriksson, born 1120, died 12. March 1162. 
 Buris Henriksson (1130 – 1167), Jarl in Jylland, married to Luitgard von Stade, (daughter of Rudolf I von Stade and his wife Richardis). After Luitgard's death in 1152 Buris fell in love with his first cousin (once removed) Kirsten, Valdemar the Great's sister, according to the ballad Prins Buris og Liden Kirsten.
 Johan Henriksson, died 1161.

1090s births
1134 deaths
Danish princes
House of Estridsen